Chies d'Alpago is a comune (municipality) in the Province of Belluno in the Italian region Veneto, located about  north of Venice and about  east of Belluno.

Chies d'Alpago borders the following municipalities: Barcis, Claut, Pieve d'Alpago, Puos d'Alpago, Tambre.

References

Cities and towns in Veneto